Parri is both a surname and a given name. Notable people with the name include:

Surname
Annette Bryn Parri, Welsh classical pianist
Ferruccio Parri (1890–1981), Italian partisan and politician
Líbero Parri (born 1982), Spanish footballer

Given name
Parri Spinelli ( – 1453), Italian painter